Elections to Three Rivers Council were held on 1 May 2003. One third of the council was up for election and the Liberal Democrat party stayed in overall control of the council.

After the election, the composition of the council was:
Liberal Democrat 27
Conservative 14
Labour 7

Election result

Ward results

References
2003 Three Rivers election result
Ward results

2003
2003 English local elections
2000s in Hertfordshire